The Lightkeepers is a 2009 American romantic comedy film written and directed by Daniel Adams, and stars Richard Dreyfuss, Blythe Danner, Bruce Dern, Mamie Gummer, Tom Wisdom and Julie Harris in her final film role. Zana Messia wrote the film's theme song.

In a two-week period beginning on Christmas 2009, the film earned $32,307 on a single screen.

Plot

The film is set on Cape Cod, Massachusetts, in 1912 and follows the story of two lighthouse attendants, one young and one old, who swear to abstain from women, until two women arrive for their summer vacation.

It is based upon The Woman Haters: A Yarn of Eastboro Twin-Lights (1911) by Joseph C. Lincoln.

Cast
Richard Dreyfuss as Seth Atkins / Bascom
Bruce Dern as Bernie
Blythe Danner as Mrs. Bascom
Mamie Gummer as Ruth
Tom Wisdom as John Brown / Russell Brooks
Julie Harris as Mrs. Deacon
Stephen Russell as Jedidiah Snow
Jason Alan Smith as Ezra
Ben Dreyfuss as Grocery Boy

References

External links 
 

2009 romantic comedy films
2009 films
Films directed by Daniel Adams (director)
American romantic comedy films
Films based on American novels
Films scored by Pinar Toprak
Films set in 1912
Films set in Massachusetts
Works set in lighthouses
2000s English-language films
2000s American films